Andreas Driendl (born January 26, 1986) is a German professional ice hockey player. He is currently playing for SC Riessersee of the DEL2. He has formerly played in the Deutsche Eishockey Liga (DEL) with the Hamburg Freezers and Krefeld Pinguine.

References

External links

1986 births
Living people
German ice hockey left wingers
Hamburg Freezers players
Krefeld Pinguine players
People from Weilheim-Schongau
Sportspeople from Upper Bavaria